The following is a list of notable AI companies of India, along with their corporate headquarters location.

References

Artificial intelligence